This is a list of launches performed or scheduled to be performed by Ariane carrier rockets between 2010 and 2019. Since 2004, only the Ariane 5 is in service, operating in the ECA and ES configurations. The last Ariane 5 ES flew in 2018. The ECA version will keep flying until 2022, when the transition to Ariane 6 should be complete.

Launch statistics

Rocket configurations

Launch outcomes

Launch history

Source: Arianespace Press Kits

Notes

References

Bibliography